Hyperlophus is a genus of sprat belonging to the herring family Clupeidae. They are endemic to the waters around Australia. There are currently two species recognized in the genus.

Species 
 Hyperlophus translucidus (McCulloch, 1917) (Transparent sandy sprat)
 Hyperlophus vittatus (Castelnau, 1875) (Sandy sprat)

References 
 

 
Taxa named by James Douglas Ogilby
Marine fish genera